Cummascach mac Fogartaig (died 797) was King of South Brega of the Uí Chernaig sept of Lagore of the Síl nÁedo Sláine branch of the southern Ui Neill. He was the son of Fogartach mac Cummascaig (died 786), the previous king. He ruled from 786 to 797.

The Síl nÁedo Sláine had been subdued in 786 by the high king Donnchad Midi (died 797). Nothing is recorded of Cummascach's reign other than his death in clerical life in 797. He is referred to as rex Deisceirt Breg -King of Southern Brega.

Notes

References

 Mac Niocaill, Gearoid (1972), Ireland before the Vikings, Dublin: Gill and Macmillan

External links
CELT: Corpus of Electronic Texts at University College Cork

Kings of Brega
797 deaths
8th-century Irish monarchs
Year of birth unknown